is a railway station in the city of Mishima, Shizuoka, Japan, operated by the Central Japan Railway Company (JR Central). It is also a union station with the Izuhakone Railway. The station was also a freight terminal of the Japan Freight Railway Company (JR Freight), although freight operations are now only on an occasional basis.

Lines
Mishima Station is served by the JR Central Tōkaidō Shinkansen and Tōkaidō Main Line and is 120.7 kilometers from Tokyo Station. The station is also the northern terminal station of the  Izuhakone Railway Sunzu Line.

Station layout
JR Mishima Station has two island platforms serving tracks 1 to 4. Track 2 and Track 3 are the primary tracks for the Tōkaidō Main Line, with Tracks 1 and 4 used for through passage of express trains. The Tōkaidō Shinkansen uses Tracks 5 and 6, which are served by a separate island platform. The adjacent Izuhakone Railway has one side platform and two bay platforms serving Tracks 7, 8 and 9. All platforms are connected by an underpass to a central concourse leading to the station building. The station building has automated ticket machines, TOICA automated turnstiles and a staffed ticket office.

Platforms

History

The original Mishima Station was opened on 15 June 1896 in the town of Nagaizumi. However, with the completion of the Tanna Tunnel between Atami and Numazu, this station was renamed Shimo-Togari Station, and a new Mishima Station was opened at its present location on December 1, 1934. The terminus of the Izuhakone Railway was also relocated to Mishima Station at this time. On April 25, 1969, Tōkaidō Shinkansen services began serving Mishima Station. Regularly scheduled freight service was discontinued in 1974, however, private freight services to the Toray Industries Mishima plant continued on a spur line until 2007. In 2008, Mishima Station was extensively remodeled, and an ASTY shopping complex was opened at the station.

Station numbering was introduced to the section of the Tōkaidō Line operated JR Central in March 2018; Mishima Station was assigned station number CA02.

Passenger statistics
In fiscal 2017, the JR portion of the station was used by an average of 30,859 passengers daily (boarding passengers only) and the Izuhakone portion of the station was used by 8,599 passengers daily (boarding passengers only).

Accidents

On 27 December 1995, the first and so far only fatality caused by the Tōkaidō Shinkansen occurred at Mishima Station when Yusuke Kawarazaki, a 17-year-old high school student, got caught in a car door, and was dragged down the platform by the leaving train.

Surrounding area

South side
 Mishima City Office

North side
 Mishima Tax Office

Bus routes
Tokai Bus Orange Shuttle
For Moto-Hakone Port

See also
 List of railway stations in Japan

References

Yoshikawa, Fumio. Tokaido-sen 130-nen no ayumi. Grand-Prix Publishing (2002) .

External links

JR Central station information 
Izuhakone Railway station information

Stations of Central Japan Railway Company
Tōkaidō Main Line
Tōkaidō Shinkansen
Izuhakone Sunzu Line
Railway stations in Shizuoka Prefecture
Railway stations in Japan opened in 1934
Mishima, Shizuoka